The 2004 Open SEAT Godó, also known as the Torneo Godó, was a men's professional tennis tournament that was part of the International Series Gold of the 2004 ATP Tour. It was the 52nd edition of the Torneo Godó and took place from 24 April until 2 May 2004 in Barcelona, Spain. Eighth-seeded Tommy Robredo won the singles title.

Finals

Singles

 Tommy Robredo defeated  Gastón Gaudio 6–3, 4–6, 6–2, 3–6, 6–3
 It was Robredo's 1st singles title of the year and the 2nd of his career.

Doubles

 Mark Knowles /  Daniel Nestor defeated  Mariano Hood /  Sebastián Prieto 4–6, 6–3, 6–4

References

External links
 ITF tournament edition details

 
2004
2004 ATP Tour